The Sloane House YMCA, also known as William Sloane House YMCA, at 356 West 34th Street in Manhattan was the largest residential YMCA building in the nation.

It was sold in 1993 for $5 million and converted to rental apartments later. It is managed by Kibel Company.

Related papers are archived.

Its pending closure was noted as part of a trend.

See also
List of YMCA buildings

References

External links

Flickr pic by wallyg

Residential buildings in Manhattan
YMCA buildings in the United States
Clubhouses in Manhattan
Hell's Kitchen, Manhattan